The Col de Couz is a pass located near the village of Saint-Jean-de-Couz, peaking at 624 m above sea level. It is located at equal distances from the ends of the valley of Couz. It connects Chambéry north-east to Les Echelles southwest side. It is crossed by the departmental road 1006. Mount Beauvoir is located west of the Col de Couz.

References

Mountain passes of Auvergne-Rhône-Alpes
Mountain passes of the Alps